Danse avec les Stars fête Noël is the first Christmas Special of the French version of Dancing with the Stars, broadcast in prime time on December 22, 2012, three weeks after the conclusion of the third season.

The two-and-a-half-hour program featured nine of the most impressive celebrities of the first three seasons of the show, paired with their respective professional ballroom dancers, with the exception of season 2 winner Shy'm, who's been a judge since season 3, and season 1's second runner-up David Ginola. As a result, non-Top 3 contestants Francis Lalanne (from season 2) and Lorie (from season 3) were brought in.

The program, once again hosted by Sandrine Quétier and Vincent Cerutti, saw each of the four judges award up to twenty points per contestant (ten for artistic and ten for technical performance) before choosing their favorite at the end, awarding him or her additional ten points. Unlike the regular shows, the special was prerecorded and as such featured no audience voting whatsoever.

Participants

Season 1
 Matt Pokora (winner)
 Sofia Essaïdi (second place)

Season 2
 Philippe Candeloro (second place)
 Baptiste Giabiconi (third place)
 Francis Lalanne (fifth place)

Season 3
 Emmanuel Moire (winner)
 Amel Bent (second place)
 Taïg Khris (third place)
 Lorie (fourth place and early favorite)

Scoring

Red numbers indicate the couples with the lowest score.
Blue numbers indicate the couples with the highest score.
 indicates the winning couple.
 indicates the runner-up couple.
 indicates the third place couple.

References

Fete Noel